Lower Rocketts is an unincorporated community in Henrico County, in the U.S. state of Virginia.

References

Unincorporated communities in Virginia
Unincorporated communities in Henrico County, Virginia